Roxy's Baby is a young adult novel by Catherine MacPhail, published in 2005. It is about a fifteen-year-old girl named Roxy who becomes pregnant and subsequently runs away from home.

Plot
Roxy is a fifteen-year-old girl living with her mother, her younger sister, and her new step-dad. Upset about her father's death and resentful of her mother remarrying, she begins to rebel. She attends a party where she has sex for the first time. Soon realising she's pregnant, Roxy runs away from home in fear. She goes to London, hoping to stay a shelter she read about, but quickly leaves when she realises the woman in charge will phone the police, when she learns Roxy is underage.

Luckily, she finds help in the form of Mr and Mrs Dyce, a couple who host young pregnant women in their country house. Things quickly become suspicious; the girls in the Dyces' care are completely cut off from the rest of the world, not allowed to leave the grounds, or even read newspapers or listen to the radio, and once a girl is sent into the birthing room she's never seen again. The Dyces have answers to all of these, but things still seem odd.

One night Roxy slips out, and discovers the Dyces have an extremely sinister motive behind their kindness...

Reception
It won the 13–16 years category at the 2006 Royal Mail Awards for Scottish Children's Books. It was also shortlisted for the Manchester Book Award and longlisted for the Carnegie Medal.

References

2005 British novels
English novels
British young adult novels
Novels about teenage pregnancy
Bloomsbury Publishing books